Oreosomatidae, the oreos, are a family of marine fish. Most of then are 43 cm at most, with the largest species reaching a length of 60 cm. Though they are small, they often have incredibly elongated lifespans, probable result of living in the deep sea (a trait shared with other unrelated fishes like the orange roughy) with the warty oreo being able to live up to 210 years, which puts it at one of the longest living vertebrates on Earth. They borrow their name from the Greek oreos (mountain) and somas (backs) for the shape of their backs. They are very flattened vertically-laterally, with 5 to 8 rays in their dorsal fin, and 2 to 4 in the anal fin, and only 1 spine in the pelvic fins. The upper part of the mouth is protractile, allowing them to snatch up little fishes, copepods, amphypods, shrimp, krill, and small cephalopods, their main diet.

References

 
Ray-finned fish families
Zeiformes